Temnopleuridea is an infraorder of sea urchins in the order Camarodonta. They are distinguished from other sea urchins by the presence of large fused plates on top of the feeding lantern. The test is usually sculpted to some degree, and has perforated tubercles.

Taxonomy 
According to World Register of Marine Species: 
 Family Glyphocyphidae Duncan, 1889 †
 Family Temnopleuridae A. Agassiz, 1872
 Family Trigonocidaridae Mortensen, 1903b
 Family Zeuglopleuridae Lewis, 1986 †

Bibliography

References

 
Extant Late Cretaceous first appearances